Wat Phra Yai, known in English as the Big Buddha Temple, is a Buddhist temple on Ko Phan (also spelled Koh Fan or Koh Faan), a small island offshore from the northeastern area of Ko Samui, Thailand, connected to that island by a short causeway  north of Samui International Airport. As its name indicates, it is home to a giant,  gold-painted Buddha statue. Since being built in 1972, it has become one of Ko Samui's main tourist attractions and a major landmark.

The statues

The Buddha statue depicts Buddha in a state of calm and purity and resolve, having overcome temptation and fear sent at him by Mara, Lord of Illusion. Known as the Mara posture, the left hand rests palm open and up in the statue's lap, the right hand facing down over the right knee, almost to the ground.

There is a second, smaller Buddha statue, depicting the Maitreya of the Future and a collection of bells around the temple's rear side.

The temple design has elements of animism, Brahminism and Buddhism in its architecture. As in many Thai temples, nāga statues line the staircase. There is a bazaar within the temple grounds selling tourist items as well as amulets and other Buddhist items.

There are many restaurants and shops around the temple in the area known as Big Buddha Beach (Bang Rak).

Location and access

The Buddha is near a beachtown called Bang Rak, now often called Big Buddha Beach. The temple is located on Thai highway 4171, which is a side route off of Highway 4169, the main route around the island.

Gallery

See also
Buddha images in Thailand
List of Buddhist temples in Thailand

References

Colossal Buddha statues
Buddhist temples in Surat Thani Province
Tourist attractions in Surat Thani province